Jamalpur is a village in Jamalpur CD block in Bardhaman Sadar South subdivision of Purba Bardhaman district in the state of West Bengal, India.

Geography

Urbanisation
95.54% of the population of Bardhaman Sadar South subdivision live in the rural areas. Only 4.46% of the population live in the urban areas, and that is the lowest proportion of urban population amongst the four subdivisions in Purba Bardhaman district. The map alongside presents some of the notable locations in the subdivision. All places marked in the map are linked in the larger full screen map.

Police station
Jamalpur police station has jurisdiction over Jamalpur CD Block. The area covered is 267.89 km2.

CD block HQ
The headquarters of Jamalpur CD block are located at Jamalpur.

Demographics
In the data published by the 2011 Census of India there is no mention of Jamalpur village, although Jamalpur community development block finds a place in the census data. Similarly, many villages around Jamalpur are mentioned (2011 census figure in brackets): Radhaballabbati (1,820), Jot Raghab (3,204), Jotkrishtai (1,328), Khanpur (2,384), Kanshra (3,220), Uttar Mohanpur (939), Halara (1,309) and other villages.

Transport
The SH 15, running from Dainhat (in Bardhaman district) to Gadiara (in Howrah district) via Tarakeswar passes through Jamalpur. Bus services available for Bardhaman, Memari, Tarakeswar and other some routes.

Education
Jamalpur Mahavidyalaya was established in 2010. It offers honours courses in Bengali, English, Sanskrit, history, political science and philosophy.

Healthcare
Jamalpur Rural Hospital at Jamalpur (with 30 beds) is the main medical facility in Jamalpur CD block. There are primary health centres at Chakdighi (with 10 beds), Chaksmanjari (with 10 beds), Illasora (with 4 beds) and Nabagram (with 4 beds).

See also - Healthcare in West Bengal

References

Villages in Purba Bardhaman district